Dean Williams may refer to:

 Dean Williams (squash player) (born 1956), retired squash player from Australia
 Dean Williams (footballer, born 1970), English football striker
 Dean Williams (footballer, born 1972), English football goalkeeper
 Dean Williams (basketball) (born 1977), British basketball player
 Dean Williams (cricketer) (born 1980), English cricketer